Richard Gemmell (6 October 1936 – 18 June 2017) was a professional rugby league footballer who played in the 1960s and 1970s.

Early life
Gemmell was born on 6 October 1936. The eldest of six children, he grew up in the Whitecross area of Warrington.

Playing career

Club career

Representative honours
Gemmell represented Lancashire while at Hull, and is one of only four players to do so, they are; Ellis Clarkson, Bob Taylor, Dick Gemmell, and Steve Prescott.

Gemmell won caps for Great Britain while at Leeds in 1964 against France, and while at Hull in 1968 against France, and in 1969 against France.

Post-playing career
After retiring as a player, Gemmell was a team manager for Great Britain on their tours to the Southern Hemisphere in 1979 and 1984.

He died on 18 June 2017, aged 80.

References

1936 births
2017 deaths
English rugby league players
Rugby league players from Warrington
Rugby league centres
Hull F.C. captains
Hull F.C. players
Leeds Rhinos players
Great Britain national rugby league team players
Lancashire rugby league team players